The YWCA, Phillis Wheatley Branch in St. Louis, Missouri is a building dating from 1927.  It was listed on the National Register of Historic Places in 1984.

The branch was founded in 1911 and named for Phillis Wheatley, the first African-American poet.  It was only the fifth YWCA for African-Americans.

The YWCA was a center of intellectual life in the Mill Creek Valley neighborhood. The Fisk Jubilee Singers performed at Wheatley in 1916, and W.E.B. Du Bois gave a lecture in 1922. Maya Angelou,  Mary McLeod Bethune  and Butterfly McQueen all visited or stayed in the YWCA's hotel rooms.

The building was constructed in 1927 for the St. Louis Women's Christian Association, also known as the Women's Christian Home, which was first organized in 1868.  In 1941 they sold the building to the YWCA.

References

External links
The YWCA Phyllis Wheatley Branch in St. Louis Celebrates Its 100th Anniversary

Clubhouses on the National Register of Historic Places in Missouri
Colonial Revival architecture in Missouri
Buildings and structures completed in 1927
YWCA buildings
Clubhouses in Missouri
Buildings and structures in St. Louis
National Register of Historic Places in St. Louis
History of women in Missouri